Springlands is a suburb to the west of Blenheim's central district. It has a tavern, various takeaways, and a superstore.

Demographics

Springlands had a population of 5,880 at the 2018 New Zealand census, an increase of 504 people (9.4%) since the 2013 census, and an increase of 864 people (17.2%) since the 2006 census. There were 2,262 households. There were 2,754 males and 3,126 females, giving a sex ratio of 0.88 males per female, with 948 people (16.1%) aged under 15 years, 894 (15.2%) aged 15 to 29, 2,385 (40.6%) aged 30 to 64, and 1,656 (28.2%) aged 65 or older.

Ethnicities were 86.6% European/Pākehā, 10.8% Māori, 4.1% Pacific peoples, 5.8% Asian, and 2.3% other ethnicities (totals add to more than 100% since people could identify with multiple ethnicities).

The proportion of people born overseas was 19.7%, compared with 27.1% nationally.

Although some people objected to giving their religion, 46.6% had no religion, 42.6% were Christian, 0.6% were Hindu, 0.1% were Muslim, 0.6% were Buddhist and 2.5% had other religions.

Of those at least 15 years old, 822 (16.7%) people had a bachelor or higher degree, and 1,071 (21.7%) people had no formal qualifications. The employment status of those at least 15 was that 2,226 (45.1%) people were employed full-time, 714 (14.5%) were part-time, and 108 (2.2%) were unemployed.

Education
Springlands School is a contributing primary (years 1-6) school with a roll of  students. The school was established in 1886.

Bohally Intermediate is a state intermediate (Year 7–8) school opened in 1957 following a split from Marlborough College.

Marlborough Girls' College is a state girls' secondary (Year 9–13) school.

The first two schools are coeducational. Rolls are as of

Historic generating station

An industrial building on Old Renwick Road, adjacent to the Transpower substation, contains diesel generators that date back to 1930.

The Marlborough Region was not connected to the rest of the national grid until the mid-1950s.  The supply of electricity to Marlborough was initially dependent on a small hydro station at Waihopai Valley.  In 1930, a diesel generator was established at Springlands to provide backup power when hydrogeneration was not available.  A further generator set was installed in 1937.  These generators have been preserved by Marlborough Lines as part of the engineering heritage of electricity supply in the region.

References

Suburbs of Blenheim, New Zealand